Little Rock College was an Roman Catholic institution of higher learning located in Little Rock, Arkansas. Founded in 1908, it closed in 1930.

Its campus is now the site of the Catholic High School for Boys.

References

Defunct private universities and colleges in Arkansas
Education in Pulaski County, Arkansas
Educational institutions established in 1908
Educational institutions disestablished in 1930
1908 establishments in Arkansas